CFRA may refer to:

 CFRA, a radio station in Ottawa, Canada
 CKKL-FM, formerly CFRA-FM, a radio station in Ottawa
 California Family Rights Act
 Chief Fire and Rescue Adviser, now Her Majesty's Chief Inspector of Fire Services
 Center for Financial Research and Analysis (CFRA Research), d/b/a of Accounting Research & Analytics, LLC 
 College Football Researchers Association